Cheng Hsin-fu (born 23 June 1965) is a Taiwanese sprinter. He competed in the men's 100 metres at the 1988 Summer Olympics.

References

External links
 

1965 births
Living people
Athletes (track and field) at the 1988 Summer Olympics
Taiwanese male sprinters
Olympic athletes of Taiwan
Place of birth missing (living people)
Asian Games medalists in athletics (track and field)
Asian Games silver medalists for Chinese Taipei
Athletes (track and field) at the 1990 Asian Games
Medalists at the 1990 Asian Games